Vladyslav Vasylyovych Moroz (born 4 October 2001) is a Ukrainian professional footballer who plays as a centre-back for Ukrainian club Volyn Lutsk.

References

External links
 Profile on Volyn Lutsk official website
 

2001 births
Living people
Sportspeople from Ternopil
Ukrainian footballers
Association football defenders
FC Volyn Lutsk players
Ukrainian First League players
Ukrainian Second League players